Palleniella  is a genus in the phylum Bacteroidota (Bacteria).

Etymology
The genus is named after the British microbiologist Mark Pallen who pioneered the automation of name creation for microorganisms.

Species
The genus contains the following species:
 Palleniella intestinalis (Hitch et al 2022)

Taxonomy 
In 2022, Hitch et al. proposed the reclassification of species previously assigned to the genus Prevotella into seven genera, including four novel genera for which the names Segatella, Hoylesella, Leyella and Palleniella were proposed. In addition to the reclassification of Prevotella, this work described four novel species, Hallella faecis, Xylanibacter rodentium, Xylanibacter muris, and Palleniella intestinalis.

See also
 Bacterial taxonomy
 Microbiology

References 

Bacteria genera
Bacteroidia